Youjiang District is the municipal district of Baise, Guangxi, China, named after the Youjiang River which runs through the middle of the district.

Administration
From June 21, 2005, for administration Youjiang District is divided into 9 parts:

 Baicheng Subdistrict, population 125,000
 Longjing Subdistrict, population 49,000 (Zhuang 80%)
 Yangxu Town, population 34,500 (Zhuang 98%)
 Sitang Town, population 25,100
 Longchuan Town, population 31,000
 Yongle Town, population 18,000
 Wangdian Yao Township, population 23,800
 Dalang Township, population 22,000
 Yangshui Township, population 9,700

Demographics
Youjiang District's population was 320,000 (2010). 73% of the people belong to the Zhuang ethnic group, and most speak Youjiang Zhuang. The rest include Han, Yao, Miao, and other ethnic groups.

References

Counties and cities in Baise